D500 may refer to:

 Dodge D500, a variant of the Chrysler B engine
 D500 road (Croatia)
 Dewoitine D.500, an aircraft
 Dodge D-500 (disambiguation), a performance model automobile
 Durrum D-500, an amino acid analyser
 Nikon D500, a 20.9 megapixel DSLR camera
 Samsung SGH-D500, a mobile phone
 Dell Latitude D500, a laptop